Goochland, is an unincorporated community  in Rockcastle County, Kentucky, United States.

References

Unincorporated communities in Rockcastle County, Kentucky
Unincorporated communities in Kentucky